Ilie Năstase won the singles title at the 1971 Pepsi-Cola Masters. He went undefeated in all five of his matches, and did not play Pierre Barthès because he had already clinched the title.

Stan Smith was the defending champion, but lost matches in the round robin to Năstase and Jan Kodeš.

Round robin

Standings

Standings are determined by: 1. number of wins; 2. number of matches; 3. number of sets won; 4. number of games won; 5. in two-players-ties, head-to-head records; 6. in three-players-ties, percentage of sets won, or of games won; 7. steering-committee decision.

See also
ATP World Tour Finals appearances

References

External links
 ATP Masters tournament results

Singles